Thunderpants is a 2002 family comedy film about a boy whose incredible capacity for flatulence gets him a job as an astronaut. The film was directed by Pete Hewitt, whose previous work included Bill & Ted's Bogus Journey (1991) and The Borrowers (1997). The script was written by Phil Hughes, based on a story by Pete Hewitt about a boy who dreams of being a spaceman, but has a problem with flatulence.

Plot
Born with two stomachs, Patrick Smash (Bruce Cook) is uncontrollably and devastatingly flatulent. No more than thirty seconds after his birth, he first breaks wind, horrifying his parents (Bronagh Gallagher, and Victor McGuire) and doctor (Robert Hardy). As he grows up, Patrick's farts become so uncontrollable and destructive that his father has to flee their home, as he is often injured by his son's gaseous emissions, whose force is so strong that it can blow people over. Patrick is bullied at school as a result of his condition, but eventually finds strength in his disorder, ultimately gaining revenge on the school bully Damon (Joshua Herdman) by passing gas in his face, leaving him scarred for life. Patrick's only friend is child prodigy Alan A. Allen (Rupert Grint), who has anosmia, and, therefore, lacks the ability to smell. Alan and Patrick team up to make Thunderpants, reinforced short trousers strong enough to contain Patrick's emissions. Eventually, Patrick learns that Alan went to the US to assist astronauts who are trapped in outer space, and Patrick finds that his condition may be of use to the spacemen in peril.

Cast

 Bruce Cook as Patrick Smash
 Rupert Grint as Alan A. Allen
 Simon Callow as Sir John Osgood
 Adam Godley as Placido P. Placeedo
 Stephen Fry as Sir Anthony Silk
 Celia Imrie as Miss Rapier
 Paul Giamatti as Johnson J. Johnson
 Ned Beatty as Gen. Ed Sheppard
 Bronagh Gallagher as Mrs Smash
 Victor McGuire as Mr Smash
 Anna Popplewell as Denise Smash
 Josh Herdman as Damon
 Leslie Phillips as Judge
 Robert Hardy as Doctor
 Devon Anderson as Dan
 Keira Knightley as Music School Student 
 Jonah Trenouth as Alan A. Allen

Reception
The film has received a rating of 67% at the film review website Rotten Tomatoes, based upon 6 reviews.

Empire magazine wrote in their review that Thunderpants is "a well-made, quirky oddity for adults, but a laugh riot for kids and Beano nostalgists... underneath all the expelled air it's really just a simple tale of a boy finding his talent and making the most of it". The hosts of the RedLetterMedia web series Best of the Worst shared similar sentiments when reviewing the film with the consensus being that the movie was too charming and well-made to be considered a "bad" film.

During an appearance on The Tonight Show with Conan O'Brien, Paul Giamatti referred to this film as one of the high points in his career.

References

External links
 
 
 Thunderpants on Variety
 Thunderpants on BBC

2002 films
2002 comedy films
British children's comedy films
German comedy films
English-language German films
Pathé films
Films about astronauts
Films directed by Peter Hewitt
Flatulence in popular culture
Films about bullying
Films produced by Graham Broadbent
Films scored by Rupert Gregson-Williams
2000s English-language films
2000s British films
2000s German films